Sunnyside Yard is a large coach yard, a railroad yard for passenger cars in the Sunnyside neighborhood of Queens in New York City. The yard is owned by Amtrak and is also used by New Jersey Transit. The Pennsylvania Railroad (PRR) completed construction of the yard in 1910; it was originally the largest coach yard in the world, occupying 192 acres (0.78 km2).

Harold Interlocking, the United States' busiest rail junction, is part of the yard. The shared tracks of the Long Island Rail Road (LIRR) Main Line and Amtrak's Northeast Corridor pass along the southern edge of the yard. Northeast of the yard a balloon track (or reverse loop) is used for "U-turning" Amtrak and NJ Transit trains which terminate at Penn Station. Leading eastward near the south side of the yard, this balloon track switches off and turns left under the LIRR/Amtrak tracks, turns left once again, and merges with the Sunnyside yard track to turn the train west toward Penn Station.

History
The Pennsylvania Railroad (PRR) completed construction of the yard in 1910. At that time, Sunnyside was the largest coach yard in the world, occupying 192 acres (0.78 km2) and containing 25.7 mi (41.4 km) of track.  The yard served as the main train storage and service point for PRR trains serving New York City. It is connected to Pennsylvania Station in Midtown Manhattan by the East River Tunnels. The Sunnyside North Yard initially had 45 tracks with a capacity of 526 cars. The South Yard had 45 tracks with a 552 car capacity.

Plans

East Side Access project

As part of the East Side Access project to the new LIRR terminal at Grand Central Terminal (opened January 25, 2023), some LIRR trains diverge from the main line and travel through a tunnel under the yard. The project would also create a new station at Queens Boulevard, named Sunnyside.

Harold Interlocking

In May 2011, a $294.7 million federal grant was awarded to address congestion at Harold Interlocking, the United States' busiest rail junction, which is part of the yard. The work will allow for dedicated tracks to the Hell Gate Line right of way for Amtrak trains arriving from or bound for New England, thus avoiding NJT and LIRR traffic.

Housing development

In 2017 it was announced that the city would begin a feasibility study into the construction of 21,000 to 31,000 units of housing on top of the rail yard. The project, which would be similar to the Hudson Yards development over West Side Yard, has stoked public controversy over the affordability of units, pedestrian and road connections, open space, and a nearby Superfund site. In Sept. 2019, a public meeting was interrupted by protestors chanting, "We Don't Trust this Process!" In early 2020, Amtrak and the city government published a master plan.

See also
 List of railroad yards in New York City
 New York Connecting Railroad
 New York Tunnel Extension
 Transportation in New York City

References

External links

 PLAZA Interlocking (The LIRR Today) 
 Track diagrams of Sunnyside Yard from 1905, 1946, 1956 and various photos - Trainsarefun.com
 Sunnyside Yard photos from Brotherhood of Locomotive Engineers Division 272
 Photos of Sunnyside Yard circa 1925.

Pennsylvania Railroad
Amtrak facilities
Long Island Rail Road
NJ Transit Rail Operations
Rail yards in New York (state)
1910 establishments in New York City
New York Tunnel Extension
Sunnyside, Queens